The National Shrine of Our Mother of Perpetual Help, also known as the Redemptorist Church and colloquially as Baclaran Church, is a prominent national shrine dedicated to Our Lady of Perpetual Help along Roxas Boulevard in Baclaran, Parañaque city of Metro Manila, Philippines. The church enshrines the icon of Our Mother of Perpetual Help, and is one of the largest Marian churches in the Philippines.

Devotion to Our Mother of Perpetual Help is popular amongst Filipino Catholics, who flood the church on Wednesdays to attend Mass and pray the Novena to Our Mother of Perpetual Help. In Manila, Wednesdays are popularly called "Baclaran Day" due to congested roads near the shrine. The original icon enshrined above the main altar came from Germany before priests of the Redemptorist Order brought it to what was then the United States territory of the Philippine Islands in 1906. Since 1958, the shrine has been authorised by the Holy See to remain open 24 hours a day throughout the entire year.

The wider shrine complex also serves as the headquarters of the Manila Vice Province of Congregation of the Most Holy Redeemer, while the Cebu Province of the Redemptorists is headquartered in Cebu. The shrine's current rector is the Rev. Fr. Rico John Bilangel, C.Ss.R. The shrine celebrates its annual feast day on June 27, the liturgical feast day of the icon.

History
The shrine and its attached convent were initially dedicated to Saint Thérèse of Lisieux; a grotto statue of the saint on the shrine grounds memorializes her patronage.

The first Redemptorists came to the Philippines in 1906 and set up a community at Opon, Cebu. The Redemptorist community first went to Malate in 1913, where they built a small, popular shrine to Our Mother of Perpetual Help. By 1932, the community transferred to Baclaran. Rev. Fr. Denis Grogan, the builder, was dedicated to Saint Thérèse of Lisieux and made her patroness of the new church and parish house. However, the Ynchaustí family, long-time supporters and friends, donated a high altar on the condition that it enshrine the icon of Our Mother of Perpetual Help.  When the church opened, the shrine became very popular.

During the Japanese occupation of the Philippines during the Second World War, invading Imperial Japanese troops overran the church, and the priests dispersed. Australian and New Zealander priests were interred in the concentration camp at University of the Philippines – Los Baños. The icon was removed from the church and given to a family for safekeeping; their home was later burned and ransacked towards the end of the occupation. The icon was initially thought lost until a De La Salle brother found it among other valuable objects that the Japanese had seized and abandoned at the Old Bilibid prison.

Contrary to popular belief, the Perpetual Help Novena did not originate in Baclaran, but at the Redemptorist Church dedicated to Saint Clement Hofbauer in La Paz, Iloilo City, first held on May 6, 1946. After witnessing the devotion of Ilonggos to the icon, the Australian Redemptorist Rev. Fr. Gerard O'Donnell,  introduced the novena to Baclaran. Linguist Rev. Fr. Leo J. English, C.Ss.R. conducted the first Baclaran Novena with 70 participants on Wednesday, June 23, 1948,  giving rise to Wednesday's local moniker of "Baclaran Day".

The present Modern Romanesque church is the third to be built on the same site. It was designed by architect César Concio.  It took six years to build because most of the money came from small donations—the suggestion from the pulpit was 10 Philippine centavos per week—that often ran out, requiring construction to stop. The foundation stone was laid on January 11, 1953, and on December 1, 1958, the new church was consecrated. The church was dedicated on December 5, 1958, and has been open 24 hours ever since.

In February 1973, Cardinal-Archbishop of Kraków Karol Wojtyła, said Mass in the shrine during a brief, unofficial stopover in Manila. In February 1981, Wojtyła, as Pope John Paul II, returned to the shrine as part of his first Apostolic Visit.

The shrine was notably the refuge of several computer engineers from the Commission on Elections (COMELEC) during the controversial 1986 Snap Elections. Thirty-five technicians who were operating the COMELEC's electronic quick count staged a walkout from their headquarters at the Philippine International Convention Center to protest alleged electoral fraud by supporters of dictator President Ferdinand Marcos. Marcos's wife, Imelda, was a benefactress of the shrine and devotee, having often brought her children there to perform the Visita Iglesia during Holy Week.

In 2015, a belfry was built as part of the shrine's redevelopment plan. The structure, which houses a 24-bell carillon cast from the world-famous foundry Grassmayr, is far from the church itself. It was blessed on September 8 that same year by Luis Antonio Cardinal Tagle, then-Archbishop of Manila. It was the first time the shrine had a bell tower since it was built. The carillon bells are automatically programmed to ring 15 minutes before every Mass or Novena service.

On September 5, 2019, the original Icon was brought down from the altar for restoration and was returned upon its completion on November 27 of the same year.

Architecture
The modern, Modern Romanesque building has a full seating capacity of 2,000, but as many as 11,000 people (including those standing) can fit inside during Masses. The baldachin, made of marble, serves as the shrine's centerpiece and is where the icon is enshrined. The ceiling design is patterned on two hands joined together as the prayer posture.

The belfry, which has mosaics of the icon on its four faces, is built closer to Roxas Boulevard some distance from the shrine. It is topped by a finial in the shape of a simplified Redemptorist coat-of-arms, particularly the Cross, Spear, and sponge on a stick of hyssop. It also hosts the Sinirangan coffee shop at its base until the COVID-19 pandemic. The coffee shop is the present site of the Perpetual Help Center and Souvenir Shop.

Organization
The shrine is under the territory of Santa Rita de Cascia Parish, located a few blocks away from the Redemptorist Church. Both are part of the Vicariate of Santa Rita de Cascia in the Diocese of Parañaque. The shrine is situated along Roxas Boulevard in Baclaran, Parañaque, Metro Manila. It is primarily financed by donations and Mass intention donations from Filipinos in the country as well as Overseas Filipinos, and in turn funds charitable social programs for the poor.

When the early Redemptorists settled at Baclaran, they insisted that the church besides their convent will not become a parish but a mission station in order to free them from sacramental work, except for the Eucharist and Penance. Redemptorists chose this arrangement to concentrate on fostering devotion to Our Mother of Perpetual Help, the administering of Sacrament of Penance, and mission work, particularly with the poor in Manila and wider Tagalog-speaking region.

Canon Law of the Catholic Church defines a shrine as “a church or other sacred place which, with the approval of the local Ordinary, is by reason of special devotion frequented by the faithful as pilgrims (Can. 1230). Canon Law explains the implications of being a shrine: “As shrines the means of salvation are to be more abundantly made available to the faithful:  by sedulous proclamation of the word of God, by suitable encouragement of liturgical life, especially by the celebration of the Eucharist and penance, and by the fostering of approved forms of popular devotion” (Can 1234 §1). “In shrines or in places adjacent to them, votive offerings of popular art and devotion are to be displayed and carefully safeguarded” (Can 1234 §2).

Rectors
 Rev. Fr. Gerard O'Donnell,  (1948)
 Rev. Fr. Lewis O'Leary,  (1948–1958)
 Rev. Fr. Patrick Deane,  (1958–1985)
 Rev. Fr. Teofilo Vinteres,  (1985–2000)
 Rev. Fr. Pedro Katigbak,  (2000–2004)
 Rev. Fr. Joseph Echano,  (2004–2007, 2015–2016)
 Rev. Fr. Victorino A. Cueto,  (2007–2015)
 Rev. Fr. Carlos G. Ronquillo,  (2016–2019)
 Rev. Fr. Victorino A. Cueto,  (2019–2023)
Fr. Rico John Bilangel,  (2023-present)

In popular culture
The church appears in the opening scene for the 1979 dramatic film "Ina Ka ng Anak Mo" (English: You are the Mother of your Child), starring Nora Aunor.
The church also appears in the 1995 action film "Alfredo Lim: Batas ng Maynila" (English: Alfredo Lim: The Law(giver) of Manila) starring Eddie Garcia.
The church was also featured in the American reality competition program The Amazing Race Season 25 in 2014.
The church's votive chapel as well as the altar makes an appearance in the romantic 2015 film You're Still The One.
The church also appears in the opening scene for the 2017 romantic comedy film Loving in Tandem.

References

External links

 Vicariate of Santa Rita de Cascia, Diocese of Parañaque
Baclaran Church in Asian Travel Magazine
Redemptorists Baclaran, Parañaque, Metro Manila
Baclaran Church on Arkitekturang Filipino Online

Romanesque Revival church buildings in the Philippines
Roman Catholic churches in Metro Manila
Roman Catholic national shrines in the Philippines
Buildings and structures in Parañaque